The Kiribati First Party (KMP) was a political party in Kiribati until it merged with Pillars of Truth to create the Boutokaan Kiribati Moa Party in 2020.

History 
The party was established in November 2019 after Banuera Berina and twelve other MPs left the Tobwaan Kiribati Party following the government's decision to cut diplomatic ties with Taiwan in favor of closer relations with China.

References

External links 
 

Political parties in Kiribati
Political parties established in 2019
2019 establishments in Kiribati